Olympia Theatre or Theater may refer to:

 Gordon's Olympia Theatre (Boston), Massachusetts, U.S.A., 1910s1996
 3Olympia Theatre, a concert hall/theatre venue in Dublin, Ireland, located in Dame Street
 Liverpool Olympia, situated next to The Grafton Ballroom on West Derby Road, Liverpool, England
 Olympia Theater (Miami), opened in 1926
 Olympia, London, an exhibition center in West Kensington
 Olympia Theater and Office Building, Miami, Florida, United States
  (AKA L'Olympia de Montréal), Canada, built 1925
 Olympia Theatre (New York), a theatre complex built by impresario Oscar Hammerstein I in Longacre Square (later Times Square), New York City, opening in 1895
 Olympia (Paris), a music hall in the 9th arrondissement of Paris
 , a theater in Valencia, Spain

See also
Olympic Theatre, a 19th-century London playhouse
Olympic Theatre, New York – 19th-century Broadway theatre
Olympic Theater, Philadelphia – opened 1873, destroyed by fire 1874

Lists of theatres